is a Japanese professional boxer who held the WBO mini-flyweight title from 2017 to 2018.

Background
Yamanaka took up boxing in the sixth grade of elementary school, after having read a boxing manga called Hajime no Ippo. In the second year of junior high school, Yamanaka began training at Hozumi Hasegawa's gym. His younger brother Daiki Yamanaka and younger sister Sumire Yamanaka are both professional boxers as well.

Professional career

Early career
Yamanaka made his professional debut against Kazuki Koyanagi on 22 June 2012. He won the fight by unanimous decision, with all three judges scoring the fight 40–36 in his favor. Yamanaka amassed a 6–1 record during the next two years, before being booked to face Hiroki Yamamoto in his first eight round bout on 6 April 2014. He won the fight by unanimous decision, with scores of 80–73, 80–73 and 80–74. This victory extended Yamanaka's winning streak to three fights, which earned him a fight against the #3 ranked OPBF minumumweight contender Roque Lauro on 22 August 2014. He lost the fight by split decision, with scores of 78–75, 75–77 and 76–77.

Yamanaka bounced back from his second professional loss with five consecutive wins, most notably beating Ronelle Ferreras by unanimous decision. This winning streak earned Yamanaka the right to face the former WBO mini flyweight champion Merlito Sabillo for the vacant OPBF mini flyweight title on 11 November 2016. He won the first twelve-round bout of his career and his first title fight by unanimous decision, with scores of 118–110, 117–111 and 119–109.

Yamanaka vacated the OPBF title on 1 February 2017, after just four months as champion. Masato Yamashita, chairman of Shinsei Gym where Yamanaka trained at that point, stated: "I want Yamanaka to fight for a world title next". On 18 March 2017, the WBO ranked Yamanaka as their #1 mini flyweight contender.

WBO mini flyweight champion

Yamanaka vs. Fukuhara
On 19 June 2017, it was announced that Yamanaka would challenge his countryman Tatsuya Fukuhara for the WBO mini flyweight title, in what was Fukuhara's first title defense and his first fight as the undisputed champion. The title bout was booked as the main event of a card which took place at the Shiroyama Sky Dome in Ashikita, Japan on 27 August 2017. Yamanaka won the fight by unanimous decision. Two of the judges scored the bout 115–113 for Yamanaka, while the third judge scored the bout 116–112 in his favor.

Yamanaka vs. Calleros
Yamanaka made his first title defense against the one-time WBO interim mini flyweight title challenger Moises Calleros on 18 March 2018, at the Portopia Hotel on Kobe, Japan. Calleros' previous title fight was against Tatsuya Fukuhara, who Yamanaka beat to win the WBO title. Yamanaka won the fight by an eight-round stoppage, as Calleros' corner chose to retire their fighter at the end of the round. He was up on points at the time of the stoppage, with two scorecards of 80–72 and one scorecard of 78–74.

Yamanaka vs. Saludar
Yamanaka made his second title defense against the #3 ranked WBO mini flyweight contender Vic Saludar. The fight was scheduled for 13 July 2018, and was contested at the Central Gym in Kobe, Japan. He lost the fight by unanimous decision, with scores of 116-111, 117-110 and 115-112. Saludar knocked Yamanaka with a straight right in the seventh round and had, by the end of the bout, opened a cut above Yamanaka's left eye. Yamanaka announced his retirement from boxing at age 23 after being diagnosed with bleeding on the brain following his decision loss to Vic Saludar. According to the rules of the Japan Boxing Commission, athletes who were found to have intracranial hemorrhage would have their licenses automatically expired, which would have prevented Yamanaka from competing domestically as well.

Return from retirement
On 9 December 2021, the Japanese Boxing Commission revised their rules to allow fighters who were diagnosed with intracranial hemorrhage to compete again, if they were cleared to do so by a physician. Ten days later, Yamanaka announced he would return to professional competition. He was booked to face Daisuke Sudo on 6 March 2022, in a light flyweight bout. Yamanaka won the fight by a fifth-round technical knockout.

Yamanaka moved up another weight-class in order to face the #15 ranked WBO flyweight contender Jonathan Taconing next. The bout was scheduled as the main event of the "REAL SPIRITS.81", which took place on 14 August 2022, at the Central Gym in Kobe, Japan. Although initially scheduled as a ten round bout, the fight duration was later changed to eight rounds. Yamanaka won the fight by unanimous decision.

Professional boxing record

See also
List of Mini-flyweight boxing champions
List of Japanese boxing world champions

References

External links

1995 births
Living people
People from Sakai, Osaka
Sportspeople from Osaka Prefecture
Japanese male boxers
Mini-flyweight boxers
World mini-flyweight boxing champions
World Boxing Organization champions